In topology and related fields of mathematics, a sequential space is a topological space whose topology can be completely characterized by its convergent/divergent sequences. They can be thought of as spaces that satisfy a very weak axiom of countability, and all first-countable spaces (especially metric spaces) are sequential.   

This property is known as sequential closure. Sequential spaces are precisely those topological spaces for which sequentially closed sets are in fact closed. (These definitions can also be rephrased in terms of sequentially open sets; see below.) Said differently, any topology can be described in terms of nets (also known as Moore–Smith sequences), but those sequences may be "too long" (indexed by too large an ordinal) to compress into a sequence. Sequential spaces are those topological spaces for which nets of countable length (i.e., sequences) suffice to describe the topology.   

Any topology can be refined (that is, made finer) to a sequential topology, called the sequential coreflection of   

The related concepts of Fréchet–Urysohn spaces, -sequential spaces, and -sequential spaces are also defined in terms of how a space's topology interacts with sequences, but have subtly different properties.  

Sequential spaces and -sequential spaces were introduced by S. P. Franklin.

History

Although spaces satisfying such properties had implicitly been studied for several years, the first formal definition is originally due to S. P. Franklin in 1965.  Franklin wanted to determine "the classes of topological spaces that can be specified completely by the knowledge of their convergent sequences", and began by investigating the first-countable spaces, for which it was already known that sequences sufficed.  Franklin then arrived at the modern definition by abstracting the necessary properties of first-countable spaces.

Preliminary definitions

A function  between topological spaces is sequentially continuous if  implies

Sequential closure/interior 
Let  be a topological space and let  be a subset.

Sequential closure and interior satisfy many of the nice properties of topological closure and interior: for all subsets 

;
; and

That is, sequential closure is a preclosure operator.  Unlike topological closure, sequential closure is not idempotent: the last containment may be strict.  Thus sequential closure is not a (Kuratowski) closure operator.

Sequentially closed and open sets

A set  is sequentially closed if ; equivalently, for all  and  such that  we must have    

A set  is defined to be sequentially open if its complement is sequentially closed.  Equivalent conditions include: 

 or

Similarly, it is possible for there to exist a sequentially closed subset that is not closed.

Sequential spaces and coreflection
As discussed above, sequential closure is not in general idempotent, and so not the closure operator of a topology. One can obtain an idempotent sequential closure via transfinite iteration: for a successor ordinal  define (as usual)and, for a limit ordinal  defineThis process gives an ordinal-indexed increasing sequence of sets; as it turns out, that sequence always stabilizes by index  (the first uncountable ordinal).

In particular, it defines a topology, the sequential coreflection. In the sequential coreflection, every sequentially-closed set is closed (and every sequentially-open set is open).

Sequential spaces 
A topological space  is sequential if it satisfies any of the following equivalent conditions:
 is its own sequential coreflection.
(Universal Property) For every topological space  a map  is continuous if and only if it is sequentially continuous (if  then ).  
 is the quotient of a first-countable space.
 is the quotient of a metric space.

If two topologies agree on convergent sequences, then they necessarily have the same sequential coreflection.

- and -sequential spaces 
 or 
Any sequential neighborhood of  can be shrunk to a sequentially-open set that contains ; formally, sequentially-open neighborhoods are a neighborhood basis for the sequential neighborhoods.
For any  and any sequential neighborhood  of  there exists a sequential neighborhood  of  such that, for every  the set  is a sequential neighborhood of 

Being a -sequential space is incomparable with being a sequential space; there are sequential spaces that are not -sequential and vice-versa.  However, a topological space  is called a -sequential (or neighborhood-sequential) if it is both sequential and -sequential.  An equivalent condition is that every sequential neighborhood contains an open (classical) neighborhood.   

Every first-countable space (and thus every metrizable space) is -sequential.  There exist topological vector spaces that are sequential but  -sequential (and thus not -sequential).

Fréchet–Urysohn spaces

A topological space  is called Fréchet–Urysohn if it satisfies any of the following equivalent conditions:  is hereditarily sequential; that is, every topological subspace is sequential.  
For every subset  

Fréchet–Urysohn spaces are also sometimes said to be "Fréchet," but should be confused with neither Fréchet spaces in functional analysis nor the T1 condition.

Examples and sufficient conditions

Every CW-complex is sequential, as it can be considered as a quotient of a metric space.   

The prime spectrum of a commutative Noetherian ring with the Zariski topology is sequential.   

Take the real line  and identify the set  of integers to a point.  As a quotient of a metric space, the result is sequential, but it is not first countable. 

Every first-countable space is Fréchet–Urysohn and every Fréchet-Urysohn space is sequential.  Thus every metrizable or pseudometrizable space — in particular, every second-countable space, metric space, or discrete space — is sequential.  

A Hausdorff topological vector space is sequential if and only if there exists no strictly finer topology with the same convergent sequences.

Spaces that are sequential but not Fréchet-Urysohn
Schwartz space and the space  of smooth functions, as discussed in the article on distributions, are both widely-used sequential spaces, but are not Fréchet-Urysohn.  Indeed the strong dual spaces of both these of spaces are not Fréchet-Urysohn either.

More generally, every infinite-dimensional Montel DF-space is sequential but not Fréchet–Urysohn.  

Arens' space is sequential, but not Fréchet–Urysohn.

Non-examples (spaces that are not sequential)
The simplest space that is not sequential is the cocountable topology on an uncountable set. Every convergent sequence in such a space is eventually constant; hence every set is sequentially open.  But the cocountable topology is not discrete. (One could call the topology "sequentially discrete".)

Consequences
Every sequential space has countable tightness and is compactly generated.

If  is a continuous open surjection between two Hausdorff sequential spaces then the set  of points with unique preimage is closed.

Categorical properties

The full subcategory Seq of all sequential spaces is closed under the following operations in the category Top of topological spaces:

The category Seq is  closed under the following operations in Top:

Since they are closed under topological sums and quotients, the sequential spaces form a coreflective subcategory of the category of topological spaces. In fact, they are the coreflective hull of metrizable spaces (that is, the smallest class of topological spaces closed under sums and quotients and containing the metrizable spaces).

The subcategory Seq is a Cartesian closed category with respect to its own product (not that of Top). The exponential objects are equipped with the (convergent sequence)-open topology. 

P.I. Booth and A. Tillotson have shown that Seq is the smallest Cartesian closed subcategory of Top containing the underlying topological spaces of all metric spaces, CW-complexes, and differentiable manifolds and that is closed under colimits, quotients, and other "certain reasonable identities" that Norman Steenrod described as "convenient"..

Every sequential space is compactly generated, and finite products in Seq coincide with those for compactly generated spaces, since products in the category of compactly generated spaces preserve quotients of metric spaces.

See also

Notes

Citations

References

 Arkhangel'skii, A.V. and Pontryagin, L.S., General Topology I, Springer-Verlag, New York (1990) .
  
  
  
  
 Engelking, R., General Topology, Heldermann, Berlin (1989). Revised and completed edition.
  
  
  
 Goreham, Anthony, "Sequential Convergence in Topological Spaces", (2016)
  
  
  
  
 
 

General topology
Properties of topological spaces